Year Zero is an idea put into practice by Pol Pot in Democratic Kampuchea that all culture and traditions within a society must be completely destroyed or discarded and that a new revolutionary culture must replace it starting from scratch. In this sense, all of the history of a nation or a people before Year Zero would be largely deemed irrelevant, because it would ideally be purged and replaced from the ground up.

The first day of "year Zero" was declared by the Khmer Rouge on 17 April 1975 upon their takeover of Cambodia in order to signify a rebirth of Cambodian history. Adopting the term as an analogy to the "Year One" of the French Revolutionary Calendar, Year Zero was effectually an attempt by the Khmer Rouge to erase history and reset Cambodian society to a zeroth year, removing any vestiges of the past.

Concept and background
Pol Pot and the Khmer Rouge, most of whom were French-educated communists, took inspiration from the concept of "Year One" in the French Revolutionary Calendar. The French "Year One" came about during the French Revolution when, after the abolition of the French monarchy on 20 September 1792, the National Convention instituted a new calendar and declared that date to be the beginning of Year I.

Year Zero of Cambodia
In 1975, the Khmer Rouge forces took over Phnom Penh, the capital of Cambodia (subsequently renamed Democratic Kampuchea, 1975–1979). Upon seizing power, Year Zero was decreed.

Hoping to transform the nation into an agrarian utopia, communist leader Pol Pot set out to reconstruct the country into a pre-industrial, classless society by attempting to turn all citizens into rural agricultural workers rather than educated city dwellers, whom Pot and his regime believed to have been corrupted by western, capitalist ideas. He declared that the nation would start again at "Year Zero", and everything that existed before Year Zero was to be eradicated. In other words, this was to be a complete and thorough reset (or even cleansing) of Cambodian society. He isolated his people from the global community; established rural collectives; dismantled the social fabric and infrastructure of Cambodia; and set about the emptying of cities, as well as the abolition of money (thus also destroying banks), private property, families, and religion.

To build the new Cambodian society, the inhabitants of the depopulated cities were sent to labour camps. The people of Phnom Penh, in particular, were forced immediately to "return to the villages" to work. Similar evacuations occurred at Batdambang, Kampong Cham, Siem Reap, Kampong Thom, among others.

Knowledge of anything pre-Year Zero was prohibited. To ensure that there was no recorded memory of a pre-Year Zero society, books were burned. (Wearing glasses was also criminalized as it was taken to indicate that one might habitually read books.) In Democratic Kampuchea, the only acceptable lifestyle was that of peasant agricultural workers. Centuries of Cambodian culture and institutions were thereby eliminated—shutting down factories, hospitals, schools, and universities—along with anyone who expressed interest in their preservation. So-called New People—members of the old governments and intellectuals in general, including lawyers, doctors, teachers, engineers, clergy, and qualified professionals in all fields—were thought to be a threat to the new regime and were therefore especially singled out and executed during the purges accompanying Year Zero.

The Khmer Rouge's takeover was rapidly followed by a series of drastic revolutionary de-industrialization policies which resulted in a death toll that vastly exceeded the toll that resulted from the French Reign of Terror.

See also
 Cambodian genocide
 Killing Fields
 Communist terrorism
 Crimes against humanity under Communist regimes
 Germany, Year Zero (1948 film)
 Mass killings under Communist regimes
 Stunde Null
 Year One
 Year Zero: The Silent Death of Cambodia (1979 documentary film)
 Man in the High Castle (2015-2019 TV series) - In a 2018 episode of the show titled 'Jahr Null', a 'Year Zero' similar to that enacted in Cambodia by Pol Pot is enacted in the United States by ruling Nazi German forces.

References

Further reading
 Lunn, Richard. 2004. Leaving Year Zero: Stories of Surviving Pol Pot's Cambodia. UWA Publishing. ISBN 1920694102.
 Pilger, John. 2014. "Year Zero." In Tell Me No Lies: Investigative Journalism and its Triumphs, edited by J. Pilger. London: Random House UK.
 Ponchaud, François. 1978. Cambodia: Year Zero, translated by N. Amphoux. New York: Henry Holt & Co. ISBN 9780030403064. See, excerpt from pp. 67, 69, 70

Khmer Rouge
Cambodian genocide
1975 in Cambodia
Pol Pot